TFF Cup (Tajikistan Football Federation Cup) (Tajiki: Ҷоми Федератсияи футболи Тоҷикистон / Jomi Federaciyai futboli Tojikiston; Russian: Кубок Федерации футбола Таджикистана),, — football tournament in Tajikistan, organized by the Tajikistan Football Federation. Founded in 2012. The tournament is the successor of the Memorial Rustam Doltabaev. Traditionally held from mid-January to mid-February, before the beginning of the new season of the Tajikistan Football League.

All finals 
Information taken from the official website of the Tajikistan Football Federation.

References

External links 
 Tajikistan Football Federation official website

Football competitions in Tajikistan
2012 establishments in Tajikistan